Jeremy Antonisse (born 29 March 2002) is a professional footballer who plays as a forward for Eredivisie club FC Emmen, on loan from Eerste Divisie team Jong PSV and the Curaçao national team.

Club career
A youth academy graduate of PSV, Antonisse signed his first professional contract with the club in August 2019. He signed a three-year contract through to the summer of 2022.

On 30 November 2020, he made his professional debut for Jong PSV in a 1–0 league defeat against SC Cambuur. He made his senior debut for PSV on 26 January 2021 in a 2–0 league win against FC Emmen. On 23 August 2021, he signed a contract extension with club until June 2024.

On 31 January 2023, Antonisse joined FC Emmen on a loan deal until the end of the season.

International career
Born in Netherlands, Antonisse is of Curaçaoan descent. He has previously represented Netherlands in youth level. On 16 October 2019, he was named in stand-by list for 2019 FIFA U-17 World Cup after missing out on 21-man final squad for the tournament.

In March 2021, he received maiden call-up to Curaçao national team for World Cup qualifying matches against Saint Vincent and the Grenadines and Cuba. He made his debut on 25 March 2021 against Saint Vincent and the Grenadines. In June 2021, he was named in Curaçao's 42-man preliminary squad for 2021 CONCACAF Gold Cup.

Career statistics

Club

International

Scores and results list Curaçao's goal tally first, score column indicates score after each Antonisse goal.

References

External links
 

2002 births
Living people
People from Rosmalen
Footballers from North Brabant
Curaçao footballers
Curaçao international footballers
Dutch footballers
Netherlands youth international footballers
Dutch people of Curaçao descent
Association football forwards
Eerste Divisie players
Jong PSV players
PSV Eindhoven players
FC Emmen players